Administración Nacional de Telecomunicaciones, also known as ANTEL   was a Salvadoran professional football club perhaps best known for being the first club where the famous El Salvadoran Mágico González played.

History
The team played in the Primera División de Fútbol de El Salvador for two seasons from 1975 to 1977. After finishing in mid-table after the 1977 season, ANTEL decided to selling their place in the first division to Independiente de San Vicente, effectively ending the club's history as a professional entity.

They then slowly went into decline and were renamed ANTEL-Telecom then again renamed Telecom FC. The club ceased to exist after the 2006/2007 season, after their main sponsor and company they were named after pulled all support due to financial pressure leaving Telecom FC to be dissolved.

Notable players

 Mágico González (1975)
 Norberto Huezo (1975)
 Miguel "Michel" Cornejo (1975)
 Herbert Machón (1975–1977)
 Quino Valencia
 Henry Moreno
 Antonio Orellana Rico
 Miguel "Mica" González (1972–1975)

Former Coaches
El Salvador
 Ricardo Tomasino (1976)

Brazil
 Jorge Tupinambá dos Santos (1975)

References

External links
 Jorge Alberto González Barillas Sus inicios en el Fútbol Profesional, ANTEL su primera casa – CD FAS 

Defunct football clubs in El Salvador
2007 disestablishments in El Salvador